Francisco Miguel Vera González (born 21 May 1994) is a Paraguayan former professional footballer who played as a striker.

Club career
Born in Minga Guazú, Vera started his career at Rubio Ñu. He then played for Paraguay's under-17's side before moving to Portuguese club Benfica in June 2015 on a €2.8 million transfer fee.

References

External links
 
 

1994 births
Living people
People from Alto Paraná Department
Association football forwards
Paraguayan footballers
Paraguay international footballers
Club Rubio Ñu footballers
Paraguayan Primera División players
S.L. Benfica B players
Liga Portugal 2 players
Centro Atlético Fénix players
Uruguayan Primera División players
Club Petrolero players
Paraguayan expatriate footballers
Expatriate footballers in Portugal
Expatriate footballers in Bolivia
Paraguayan expatriate sportspeople in Portugal
Paraguayan expatriate sportspeople in Bolivia